is Japanese idol group AKB48's third single, and the first major single released through DefSTAR Records, on 25 October 2006.

Regarded as the signature song of AKB48, the song has continued to be AKB48's most recognizable tune among the public. It was also the theme song for the AKB48 TV show AKBingo! until 2016.

Promotion
With support from DefStar Records, the song has played a major role in causing the public to take notice of AKB48, as it has been frequently used as an introductory song when AKB48 appears on TV programs as guests, including the 58th NHK Kōhaku Uta Gassen.  It is also the theme song of their own TV late night show, AKBingo!, which has been broadcast since 2008.

The girls took a trip down to Tateyama, Chiba to film the video clip, with the main dance scenes set at the cliff of the Sunosaki Lighthouse.

 Original Trading Cards (one of 3 different designs)
 Limited-time online-only video ConnecteD CD edition (recorded special private video originally distributed as online-only)
 The ultimate right of application (any one of followings:Application must be received by 22 November 2006))
Award A:  100 pairs (200 persons)
Award K:  50 pairs (100 persons)
Award B:  300 persons

Reception
The single charted for six weeks in the top 200, with the highest rank at #12 in 2006, coming back in the top 200 in 2010 and charting since the second week of September 2010. "Aitakatta" sold 25,544 copies, during the first 6 weeks charted on Oricon.

Personnel
The title track involved 20 members selected from Team A and Team K.
 Center: Atsuko Maeda
Team A - Tomomi Itano, Haruna Kojima, Atsuko Maeda, Minami Minegishi, Rina Nakanishi, Risa Narita, Tomomi Ōe, Mai Oshima, Mariko Shinoda, Minami Takahashi, Hana Tojima
Team K - Sayaka Akimoto, Tomomi Kasai, Kana Kobayashi, Natsumi Matsubara, Sae Miyazawa, Kayo Noro, Erena Ono, Yuko Oshima, Ayaka Umeda

Usage in media
This song was featured on Season 2, Episode 1 of James May's Cars of the People, as James May was driving a 1980 Mazda 323 around Hiroshima.

The song was also supposed to earn a spot in the 2011 dance video game Just Dance Wii, but it was removed for unknown reasons.

Track listing

Charts

Sales and certifications

BNK48 version

The Thai idol group BNK48, a sister group of AKB48, covered the song and named it "Yak Cha Dai Phop Thoe" ("Wanted to Meet You").

Production
The single was produced by a team led by Pongchuk Pissathanporn from La-Ong-Fong band.

The Thai lyrics were written by Natapol Srijomkwan from Groove Riders band together with Pongchuk Pissathanporn and Tanupop Notayanont from La-Ong-Fong band.

The cover art of the single, produced by The Uni_form Design Studio, was revealed on 17 July 2017, depicting the sixteen senbatsu members with folded paper representing elements from the songs, as buses from "Ōgoe Diamond" and paper planes from "365 Nichi no Kamihikōki", including elements from the Thai culture, as barb mobiles, and those from the Japanese culture, as paper cranes.

The music video for "Yak Cha Dai Phop Thoe" was directed by Wanweaw Hongvivatana and Weawwan Hongvivatana, twin directors from GDH 559. The video was notably not marketed as the official music video.

Promotion
The three songs in the single were first performed at the group's debut event on 2 June 2017.

Sixteen members of the group were then selected as senbatsu to promote the single, consisting of Can, Cherprang, Jaa, Jan, Jennis, Kaew, Kaimook, Miori, Music, Namhom, Namneung, Noey, Orn, Pun, Satchan, and Tarwaan. Music serves as the centre for "Aitakatta" and "Ōgoe Diamond", whereas Jennis is the centre for "365 Nichi no Kamihikōki".

A change was made to this set of senbatsu for the event Japan Expo in Thailand 2017, held in Bangkok on 1 and 3 September 2017, after Jan, Kaew, Orn, and Namneung were demoted to undergirls after being found in violation of undisclosed rules (reportedly truancy), and were replaced by Jane, Mobile, Pupe, and Rina Izuta.

To support the single, the group held its first handshake event in Bangkok on 27 August 2017, attracting almost 4,000 fans.

The music video for the song "Yak Cha Dai Phop Thoe" was released on 29 November 2017 after announcing that the song would be used for the soundtrack of the television series, Project S the Series ("Shoot! I Love You" Part).

Release and sales
The single was officially released on 8 August 2017. Physical CDs were available for purchase from 7 to 19 July 2017 only, during which it sold a total of 13,500 copies.

Critic Nutthapong Chaiwanitphon observed that the total sales for the BNK48 single has been low.

Track listing

 Bold indicates centres.

MNL48 version

The Filipino idol group MNL48, a sister group of AKB48, covered the song and named it "Gustong Makita" (Want to meet you). It is their first single released on September 28, 2018.

Tracklisting

 Bold indicates centers.

References

AKB48 songs
BNK48 songs
MNL48 songs
2006 singles
2017 singles
2018 singles
Songs with lyrics by Yasushi Akimoto
Defstar Records singles
2006 songs
2017 songs
2018 songs